Sulfobacillus thermotolerans is a species of thermotolerant, chemolithotrophic, Gram-positive, aerobic, endospore-forming, acidophilic bacterium with type strain Kr1T (=VKM B-2339T =DSM 17362T). Its cells are straight to slightly curved rods, 0.8–1.2 μm in diameter and 1.5–4.5 μm in length.

References

Further reading

External links

LPSN
Type strain of Sulfobacillus thermotolerans at BacDive -  the Bacterial Diversity Metadatabase

Bacillales
Bacteria described in 2006
Acidophiles